Elgin Crescent is a street in Notting Hill, London, England.

It runs west from Portobello Road, crosses Ladbroke Grove and at its south-western end joins Clarendon Road. The section between Portobello Road and Kensington Park Road is formed of shops, cafes and restaurants, whilst the remainder is residential.

The houses were built in the 1850s and 1860s, and most share communal gardens. Many are now listed buildings. East of Ladbroke Grove, it was originally called Elgin Road. It is named after the town of Elgin in Scotland.

Notable residents
 60 – Jawaharlal Nehru (1889–1964), First Prime Minister of India, lived there 1910–12
 79 – Sir Osbert Lancaster (1908–1986), cartoonist, born there
 86 – Sir Laurence Olivier (1907–1989), actor and director, lived there 1910–14
 95 – Katherine Mansfield, New Zealand born short-story writer
 98 -  Margaret Fairchild (1911-1989), aka Miss Shepherd - The Lady in the Van - lived here in the 1950s with her mother
 106 – John Alexander Fladgate (1809–1901), a port wine merchant, lived and died there
 121 – Amy Clarke (1892–1980), mystical poet and writer, born there
 Boris Johnson, prime minister of the United Kingdom (former resident)
 Rachel Johnson, journalist and author
 Sax Rohmer, author, creator of Dr Fu Manchu

References

Notting Hill
Streets in the Royal Borough of Kensington and Chelsea